The Vintage Motorcycle Museum is an appointment only museum in Chehalis, Washington.  The collection, founded in 1979 by retired building contractor Frank Mason, includes pre-1916 motorcycles, photographs and memorabilia. Mason and his wife Barbara bought and renovated the historic 1889 Washington Hotel building in Chehalis after it burned in 1997, and moved the collection there.

The museum moved its collection in 2021 to the Marketplace Square building, half a block south from the hotel.

References
Notes

Bibliography
 

Motorcycle museums in the United States
Transportation museums in Washington (state)
Museums in Lewis County, Washington
Chehalis, Washington
1979 establishments in Washington (state)